Mechouia salad ("grilled salad") is a Tunisian salad. A very popular first course dish from Tunisia, a country in North Africa that appreciates spiciness, it is especially consumed in the summer, and is a grilled vegetable, tomatoes, peppers, onions and garlic salad, that may also contain eggplant. They are grilled in the oven or on the stove and then ground together, spiced, and then tuna and olive oil are added, and sometimes boiled eggs are placed for decoration.

Health benefits
Slata Mechouia is a major dietary source of the antioxidant lycopene which has been linked to many health benefits,
including reduced risk of heart disease and cancer. They are also a great source of vitamin C, potassium, folate and vitamin K.
Contains fiber, vitamin E and C.
North Africans use it to reduce inflammation and heal infections.

See also
 List of Arabic salads

References

Arab cuisine
Salads
Vegetable dishes of Tunisia